Sir Charles Henry Stewart (b. 1824 - d. 1894) was a Puisne Justice of the Supreme Court of Ceylon who served from 1867 to 1879, except while on leave during 1 January - 28 April 1871 when George Lawson acted for him. He was knighted by Queen Victoria and married Helen Margaret Mackenzie, daughter of Thomas Mackenzie, chief of the Mackenzies of Dundonnell.
He was a member of Lincoln's Inn and the Thatched House Club in London. He is the great great uncle of Nalin Thomas Jay, who is also a member of Lincoln's Inn and currently CEO of Carnegie Stewart in Hong Kong.

Citations

Bibliography 

 

Puisne Justices of the Supreme Court of Ceylon
British expatriates in Sri Lanka
19th-century British people
19th-century Sri Lankan people
1824 births
1894 deaths